The 2012–13 All-Ireland Intermediate Club Football Championship was the 10th staging of the All-Ireland Intermediate Club Football Championship since its establishment by the Gaelic Athletic Association for the 2003–04 season.

The All-Ireland final was played on 9 February 2013 at Croke Park in Dublin, between Cookstown Fr. Rock's and Finuge. Cookstown Fr. Rock's won the match by 1-09 to 0-06 to claim their second championship title overall and a first title in three years.

References

2012 in Irish sport
2013 in Irish sport
All-Ireland Intermediate Club Football Championship
All-Ireland Intermediate Club Football Championship